Sefa İşçi (born 26 March 1996) is a Turkish footballer who last played for Fatih Karagümrük as a right back.

Career

In July 2014 he joined S.V. Zulte Waregem, coming from R.S.C. Anderlecht's youth academy. He made his first team debut at 31 July 2014 in the UEFA Europa League qualifying round against Shakhtyor Soligorsk.

References

External links
 
 
 
 

1996 births
Living people
Turkish footballers
Turkey youth international footballers
Belgian people of Turkish descent
Belgian footballers
Belgium youth international footballers
Belgian Pro League players
S.V. Zulte Waregem players
Footballers from Ghent
Association football fullbacks